The North Bay Battalion is a junior ice hockey team in the Ontario Hockey League based in North Bay, Ontario, Canada. The franchise was founded as the Brampton Battalion on December 3, 1996, and began play in 1998. The team relocated to North Bay prior to the 2013–14 OHL season.

History

Early years, 1998–2013
The Brampton Battalion's inaugural season began in 1998–99, choosing the Battalion name from community suggestions, and was also adopted by the competitive minor hockey program in Brampton. The team struggled in its first season, winning only 8 of 68 games. However, it would be one of only two seasons (the other being 2001–02) in which the Brampton Battalion would miss the playoffs.  The fifteen-season tenure in Brampton saw the Battalion finish with a .484 win percentage in 1,020 regular season games and win four Central Division Championships and one Eastern Conference Championship.

Relocation
During the summer of 2012, it was rumoured the Battalion franchise would relocate as their lease agreement with the Powerade Centre was nearing an end. Attendance was consistently low and declining in Brampton as well as an unfavourable lease. On November 5, 2012, an agreement in principle to move the Battalion to North Bay for the 2013–14 season was agreed upon following a meeting with the city council in North Bay. Nine days later, fans in North Bay had already bought over 2,000 season tickets as per the conditions of the agreement. The Battalion would play out of the North Bay Memorial Gardens, which had to undergo major renovations in order to meet league standards. Franchise owner Scott Abbott stated that the team would continue to use the Battalion moniker in North Bay, paying homage to the city's strong military history.

2013–14
The Battalion began the 2013–14 season with a nine game road trip due to the ongoing renovations at the Memorial Gardens. On September 20, 2013, North Bay played in their first game, losing 5–2 to the Kingston Frontenacs. Mike Amadio scored the first goal for North Bay. The following night, the Battalion earned their first victory defeating the Belleville Bulls 4–1.

The Battalion played their first home game on October 11, losing 2–1 to the Peterborough Petes in front of a sold out crowd of 4,236. On October 14, the Battalion defeated the Niagara IceDogs 5–4 in a shootout for their first home win of the season.

North Bay's finished the 2013–14 season with the best record in the Central Division, going 38–24–4–2 and earning 82 points. North Bay averaged 3,366 fans per game during the season, which represented an increase of more than 1,200 fans per game than in their final season in Brampton.

In the post-season, the Battalion defeated the Niagara IceDogs in a close seven-game series, as North Bay won the seventh game by a 2–1 score in front of a sold out crowd of 4,249. The Battalion defeated the Barrie Colts in six games in the second round. In the third round, North Bay defeated the favoured Oshawa Generals with a four game sweep. The Battalion's run ended in the J. Ross Robertson Cup finals, losing to the Guelph Storm in five games.

2014–15
North Bay had another strong regular season in 2014–15, as the club earned a record of 37–20–6–5 and 85 points, a three-point improvement over their point total. The Battalion finished in second place in the Central Division. Nick Paul won the Dan Snyder Memorial Trophy, awarded to the OHL player who is a positive role model.

The Battalion had another long playoff run in 2015, as the club swept the Kingston Frontenacs in the first round, followed by a five-game series win over the Barrie Colts. The Battalion season ended in the Eastern Conference finals, as North Bay lost to the Oshawa Generals in six games.

Attendance for the Battalion improved slightly in 2014–15, as the club averaged 3,447 per game, ranking 14th in the league.

2015–16
The Battalion had another solid regular season with a record of 35–23–6–4 for 80 points and second place in the Central Division in 2015–16 season. Mike Amadio was awarded the William Hanley Trophy, awarded to the most sportsmanlike player in the OHL. Amadio became the first Battalion player since the move to North Bay to score 50 goals in a season.

In the post-season, North Bay defeated the Peterborough Petes in seven games in the first round, winning the seventh game by a 4–1 score in front of 3,810 fans at home. The Battalion were then swept by the Barrie Colts in the second round.

Battalion attendance dropped slightly during this season, averaging 3,327 fans per game, ranking 14th in the OHL.

2016–17
Following three straight seasons of 80+ points, the Battalion entered a rebuilding phase during the 2016–17 season. North Bay failed to qualify for the post-season, finishing ninth in the Eastern Conference with a 24–38–5–1 record and 54 points.

Battalion attendance plummeted during the season with an average of 2,601 fans per game, ranking last in the league.

2017–18
The Battalion improved to a 30–28–7–3 record during the 2017–18 season, earning 70 points and returning to the post-season as the sixth place team in the Eastern Conference. In the post-season, the Battalion lost to the Kingston Frontenacs in six games. The third game of the series was moved from North Bay to the Sudbury Community Arena due to the 2018 Ford World Women's Curling Championship held at the North Bay Memorial Gardens. In game six of the series, goaltender Christian Propp made an impressive 71 saves, including 43 saves in overtime, as North Bay lost to the Frontenacs 6–5 in triple overtime.

Despite the improvements during the season, Battalion attendance dropped to 2,385 fans per game, still last in the OHL, and loss of over 1,000 fans per game since their peak of 3,447 fans in the 2014–15 season.

2018–19
North Bay struggled during the 2018–19 season, however, the club qualified for the post-season for the fifth time in six seasons since their move from Brampton, as the club had a 30–33–3–2 record, earning 65 points and seventh place in the Eastern Conference. Justin Brazeau, in his final season with the Battalion, scored 61 goals and 113 points, leading the OHL in goals and finishing second in overall points. Brazeau won the Jim Mahon Memorial Trophy as the top scoring right winger in the OHL and the Leo Lalonde Memorial Trophy as the OHL overage player of the year.

In the post-season, the Battalion lost to the Niagara IceDogs in five games in the first round, making it the third consecutive season that the club did not advance past the first round of the playoffs.

Battalion attendance declined slightly during the season, averaging a league-low 2,350 fans per game. This was the third straight season in which North Bay finished in last in attendance.

2019–20
On December 10, 2019, the team announced that Stan Butler who had coached and managed the Battalion since its first game in Brampton had been reassigned as a special advisor to the team owner. Adam Dennis was named the new general manager, and Ryan Oulahen was named the interim head coach.

On March 24, 2020, the team announced that  Ryan Oulahen was named the second head coach in North Bay Battalion history. Oulahen has agreed to a three-year contract to oversee a coaching staff that includes assistants  Scott Wray and  Bill Houlder.

Championships
The North Bay Battalion have won two division titles and one conference championship in its first season in North Bay.

Emms TrophyCentral Division Champions
 2013–14
 2021-22

Bobby Orr Trophy
Eastern Conference Champions
2013–14

Uniforms and logos
The Battalion's uniform is primarily an army-like shade of olive green. The shoulders feature black bars, with white outlining, this is then further outlined in black. Evenly between the shoulder and elbow lie three military-style chevrons, connoting rank (here, sergeant) completing armed forces theme.

The logo itself, featuring their mascot, Sarge, gritting his teeth is also army olive green, a mix of yellow and beige, white, fleshish pinky-orange, black, and red. The name Battalion, emblazoned on their uniform is pure red, and is created in a way that it looks three-dimensional.

Arena
The North Bay Battalion play out of the North Bay Memorial Gardens.  Built in 1955, it is best known as the home of the North Bay Centennials from 1982 until 2002, after which they moved to Saginaw, Michigan, and became the Saginaw Spirit.  Most recently, it has served as the home of the Northern Ontario Junior Hockey League's North Bay Trappers from 2002 until 2014, as well as the Nipissing University Lakers hockey team playing in Canadian Interuniversity Sport as a member of the Ontario University Athletics conference.

With the Battalion's arrival and subsequent 15-year lease, the Gardens underwent a $12 million renovation; the seating capacity increased to 4,246, the ice surface was reconfigured to new OHL standards, ten private boxes were added and a new two-level team dressing room was built.

NHL alumni
List of Battalion alumni who played in the National Hockey League (NHL):

Michael Amadio
Cam Dineen
Barclay Goodrow
Nick Paul
Ben Thomson

Broadcasting
TVCogeco broadcasts home games, and away games that are televised. Greg Theberge is a commentator for the Battalion. Country 600 CKAT broadcasts Battalion games on radio.

Season-by-season results

Regular season
Legend: OTL = Overtime loss, SOL = Shootout loss

Playoffs
2013–14 Beat Niagara IceDogs 4 games to 3 in conference quarter-finals.  Beat Barrie Colts 4 games to 2 in conference semi-finals.  Beat Oshawa Generals 4 games to 0 in conference finals.  Lost to Guelph Storm 4 games to 1 in J. Ross Robertson Cup finals.
2014–15 Beat Kingston Frontenacs 4 games to 0 in conference quarter-finals.  Beat Barrie Colts 4 games to 1 in conference semi-finals.  Lost to Oshawa Generals 4 games to 2 in conference finals.
2015–16 Beat Peterborough Petes 4 games to 3 in conference quarter-finals.   Lost to Barrie Colts 4 games to 0 in conference semi-finals.
2016–17 Missed playoffs.
2017–18 Lost to Kingston Frontenacs 4 games to 1 in conference quarter-finals.
2018–19 Lost to Niagara IceDogs 4 games to 1 in conference quarter-finals.
2019–20 Missed playoffs.
2020–21 Cancelled.
2021–22 Beat Ottawa 67's 4 games to 0 in conference quarter-finals.  Beat Kingston Frontenacs 4 games to 1 in conference semi-finals.  Lost to Hamilton Bulldogs 4 games to 0 in conference finals.

See also
List of ice hockey teams in Ontario

References

External links
 

Sport in North Bay, Ontario
Ontario Hockey League teams
Ice hockey clubs established in 2013
2013 establishments in Ontario